Leonardo Cerri (born 4 March 2003) is an Italian professional footballer who plays as a striker for  club Juventus Next Gen.

Career

Early career 
Born in Rome, Italy, Cerri began his youth career playing futsal at Atletico Torrino, before joining Lupa Roma in 2015. After one year he moved to Unicusano Fondi and, in summer of 2017, he joined Pescara. In the 2018–19 season, Cerri scored 14 goals with Pescara's under-16s; he also played three games with the under-17s at the end of the season, scoring a goal.

Juventus 
On 2 July 2019, Cerri joined Juventus in a transfer worth €1.1 million, with Pescara having 50% of his future sale. He played for the under-17s in the 2019–20 season, scoring 12 goals in 17 games. In 2020–21, Cerri was moved to the under-19s, playing in the Campionato Primavera 1.

On 24 January 2021, Cerri scored on his debut for Juventus U23 – the reserve team of Juventus – in the Serie C, coming on as a substitute and scoring the equalizer in a 1–1 draw against Pro Sesto. He also scored a disallowed goal in the 90+5th minute. Cerri made three further appearances for the under-23s in 2020–21, as well as two in 2021–22. In the 2021–22 season, he scored nine goals in 27 appearances (including 13 as a substitute) for Juventus U19, also helping the to reach the semi-finals, their best-ever placing in the competition.

On 6 July 2022, he signed a new contract for Juventus after the previous had expired six days earlier. On 7 December, he scored Juventus Next Gen's opener in their 2–1 win to Padova in the Coppa Italia Serie C.

Style of play 
Cerri has been likened to former Italian footballer Luca Toni for his movements, position, and height. At , Cerri is a tall, left-footed striker, whose main characteristics are his physical presence in the box and his heading.

Career statistics

Club

Notelist

References

External links 
 
 

2003 births
Living people
Footballers from Rome
Italian footballers
Association football forwards
Lupa Roma F.C. players
S.S. Racing Club Fondi players
Delfino Pescara 1936 players
Juventus F.C. players
Juventus Next Gen players
Serie C players
Italy youth international footballers